OlsenDaines is mid-sized law firm based in the Pacific Northwest.  It was founded in 1978 by Managing Partner Eric Olsen.  While the bulk of its administrative staff work in the Salem, Oregon office, OlsenDaines has offices throughout Oregon and Washington.  The firm specializes in bankruptcy, personal injury and social security disability law.

OlsenDaines was listed as number sixty in Oregon Business' 2010 Law Firms Powerlist.  In November 2010, OlsenDaines Attorney Keith Karnes was named a Rising Star by Super Lawyers. On May 5, 2011, Karnes testified before the Oregon Senate Judiciary Committee in favor of Oregon HB 2682, legislation that would bring Oregon's garnishment statute in line with the federal mandated exempt $217.50 after tax wages. Karnes was also elected as the chair of the Oregon State Bar Consumer Law Section in October 2009.

References

External links
OlsenDaines website

Law firms based in Oregon
Companies based in Salem, Oregon
1979 establishments in Oregon
Law firms established in 1979